Sydney MacDonald Lamb (born May 4, 1929 in Denver, Colorado) is an American linguist  and professor at Rice University,  whose stratificational grammar is a significant alternative theory to Chomsky's transformational grammar. 
He has specialized in Neurocognitive Linguistics and a stratificational approach to language understanding.

Lamb earned his Ph.D. from the University of California, Berkeley in 1958 and taught there from 1956 to 1964. His dissertation was a grammar of the Uto-Aztecan language Mono, under the direction of  Mary Haas and Murray B. Emeneau. In 1964, he began teaching at Yale University before joining the Semionics Associates in Berkeley, California in 1977. Lamb did research in North American Indian languages specifically in those geographically centered on California. His contributions have been wide-ranging, including those to historical linguistics, computational linguistics, and the theory of linguistic structure. His work led to innovative designs of content-addressable memory hardware for microcomputers.

Lamb is best known as the father of the Relational Network Theory (RNT) of language, which is also known as Stratificational Linguistics. Near the turn of the millennium, he began developing the theory further and exploring its possible relationships to neurological structures and to thinking processes. His early work developed the notion of "sememe" as a semantic object, analogous to the morpheme or phoneme in linguistics; it was one of the inspirations of Roger Schank's Conceptual dependency theory, a methodology for representing language meaning directly within the Artificial Intelligence movement of the 1960s/1970s.

In 1999, his book — Pathways of the Brain: The Neurocognitive Basis of Language expressing some of these ideas — was published.
See also: "Linguistic and Cognitive Networks" in Cognition: A Multiple View (ed. Paul Garvin) New York: Spartan Books, 1970, pp. 195–222. Reprinted in Makkai and Lockwood, Readings in Stratificational Linguistics (1973), pp. 60–83.

References

External links 
  Language and Brain: Neurocognitive Linguistics
 Lamb biography

1929 births
Living people
Linguists from the United States
Rice University faculty
University of California, Berkeley alumni
Linguists of Uto-Aztecan languages